This is the episodes' list of The Animals of Farthing Wood.

Series overview

Episodes

Season 1 (1993)

Season 2 (1994)

Season 3 (1995)

Home releases
The classic VHS titles of the series, released through BBC Video, were nine volumes in all, each amalgamating several episodes to form feature-length omnibuses. Because of time limitations on each cassette, some original episode sequences were cut out. Such scenes removed from the series one VHS titles, for example, included Fox's confrontation with the farmer's dog, and his conversation and 'employment' with the town cat, where he kills several mice. The swimming pool scene from the journey is also excluded.

DVD releases
Series 1 came out in France in February 2009.

Series 1 was released in Germany on 25 September 2009, and Series 2 was released in Germany on 27 May 2011. The German DVD releases offer both English and German audio options. Series 3 has also been released in Germany.

Despite being a UK production, the whole series was not released on DVD in the UK until 3 October 2016

VHS releases
VHS titles were as follows:

 Vol. 1: "The Journey Begins"
 Vol. 2: "From Copse to Quarry"
 Vol. 3: "On to White Deer Park"
 Vol. 4: "The Challenge of Winter"
 Vol. 5: "Friends & Enemies"
 Vol. 6: "New Beginnings"
 Vol. 7: "New Dangers"
 Vol. 8: "The Rise of the Rats"
 Vol. 9: "The Wanderers' Return"

'New Beginnings' was the first TAOFW video title to receive a 'PG' certificate from the BBFC, largely due to the violent battle between Fox and Scarface and the strong emphasis on death, although generally the content was actually not much grimmer than that in earlier volumes.

In 1996, Another tape was released entitled "Three Tales" featured 'Toad's Tale', 'Badger's Tale' and 'The Foxes' Tale'. This was compiled from series 1 and 2.

Individual episodes were also available on VHS as part of a running promotion in 'Farthing Wood Friends' magazine.

References

External links

Lists of British animated television series episodes
Lists of French animated television series episodes
Lists of Spanish animated television series episodes
Lists of British children's television series episodes